Khayyam University (KHU) is a university in Mashhad, Iran. It offers Higher National Degree (HND), undergraduate (bachelor's degree) and postgraduate (master's degree) programs. Students study 25 subjects in five major programs of science, literature and humanities, engineering, art and architecture, and administrative sciences. More than 6000 students have graduated. It has over 49 full-time, 12 part-time academic members, and 256 session instructors with about 5000 students.

Khayyam University has achieved a high standard of education amongst the non-governmental universities.

It was established as a response to the high demand for higher education by those interested in studying in the Islamic Republic of Iran.

Administration
This university is private and receives no financial aid from the government. It is self-financed by the private budget and fees, which it receives from the students with the confirmation of Ministry of Science, Research and Technology of Iran.

The board of trustees is the top governor of the university. KHEU is a comprehensive university with many faculties and offers degrees at the  Bachelor and Master levels.

Campuses
Khayyam University is functioning in two campuses: the main campus is on Fallahi Blvd and the new campus is in the Elahia region. There are several laboratories, covered sport saloon and computer sites.

Digital library
Khayyam digital library is accessible for all staff and students. The electronic administration process is called Peyvand Administrative Automation.

Faculties
 Faculty of Engineering: The Faculty of Engineering is on the Elahiyeh campus. It offers B.S and A.D degrees in electrical, computer, and mechanical engineering.
 Faculty of Science: The Faculty of Science is on the main campus. It offers B.Sc. and M.Sc. degrees in Physics and Mathematics.
 Faculty of Literature and Human Science
 Faculty of Economic
 Faculty of Art and Architecture

References

Universities in Iran
1992 establishments in Iran
Buildings and structures in Mashhad
Education in Razavi Khorasan Province